Session 9 is a 2001 American psychological horror film directed by Brad Anderson and written by Anderson and Stephen Gevedon. The film stars David Caruso, Peter Mullan, Brendan Sexton III, Josh Lucas, and Gevedon as an asbestos abatement crew who take a clean-up job at an abandoned mental asylum amid an intense work schedule, growing tensions, and mysterious events occurring around them. Its title refers to a series of audio-taped sessions with an asylum patient that run parallel to the crew's experiences.

The film marked a tonal departure for Anderson, who previously only directed romantic comedies. Production took place on location at the Danvers State Mental Hospital in Danvers, Massachusetts. While not a financial success, Session 9 developed a reputation as a cult film.

Plot 
Gordon Fleming, the owner of an asbestos abatement company in Massachusetts, makes a bid to remove asbestos from Danvers State Mental Hospital. Desperate for money, he promises to complete the job in only one week, despite requiring two to three weeks. His crew includes Mike, a law school dropout who is knowledgeable about the asylum's history; Phil, who is dealing with his grief over a recent breakup; Hank, a gambling addict; and Gordon's nephew Jeff, who has a pathological fear of the dark.

While surveying the job site, Gordon hears a disembodied voice that greets him by name. The men begin their job, and Mike discovers a box containing nine audio-taped sessions that were recorded with Mary Hobbes, a patient who suffered from dissociative identity disorder. Mike begins listening to the tapes in the ensuing days. In the sessions, Mary's psychologist attempts to unveil details surrounding a crime she committed at her home two decades prior and Mary exhibits numerous personalities who have unique voices and demeanors. Meanwhile, Hank discovers a cache of antique silver dollar coins and other valuables from the crematory. Late that night, Hank returns to the hospital to retrieve the items, and discovers a lobotomy pick among them. He becomes frightened by noises and a shadowy figure, and is confronted by an unknown assailant.

Hank fails to show up to work the next day. An additional worker, Craig McManus, is hired to take his place. Gordon confides in Phil that he slapped his wife Wendy after she inadvertently splashed him with boiling water, and that she refuses to answer his calls or let him see their infant daughter. In a stairwell in the hospital, Jeff witnesses Hank staring out a window wearing sunglasses, talking to himself.

Hank goes missing and the men split up to search for Hank, but Mike is compelled to continue listening to the tapes. Jeff and Phil descend into the tunnels underneath the hospital where Phil finds Hank, half-nude, muttering to himself. The generator runs out of fuel, leaving a terrified Jeff trapped in darkness. Mike restores the electricity and continues listening to the ninth session tape, which reveals that one of Mary's malignant personalities, "Simon," was responsible for Mary stabbing her little brother and parents to death. Phil finds Gordon in Mary's former hospital room, staring at photos from his daughter's baptism which he has pasted to the wall. Jeff emerges from the tunnels and is attacked by an unseen assailant at the company van.

The following day, Gordon arrives at the hospital and finds Hank wrapped in plastic sheeting in one of the rooms, the lobotomy pick protruding from his eye. Gordon is then confronted by Phil, who repeatedly tells him to "wake up" before vanishing in front of him. Craig witnesses Gordon standing over Hank, who is barely alive. Gordon attacks Craig before pulling the lobotomy pick from Hank's eye and stabbing it into Craig′s. Gordon, in a dissociated state, finds the bodies of each of his crew members in various rooms in the hospital, and recounts his murdering each of them. He also recalls killing Wendy, his daughter, and the dog after Wendy spilled the boiling water on him.

Distraught, Gordon confusedly attempts to call his home to apologize to Wendy. An excerpt from the ninth session tape plays: Mary's doctor asks her "And where do you live, Simon?" to which "Simon" responds: "I live in the weak and the wounded, Doc."

Cast

Interpretations 
In reviewing the film for the 2003 edition of The Year's Best Fantasy and Horror, Edward Bryant contends that Simon is not necessarily an alternate personality of the former patient Mary, but rather a malevolent  genius loci. He also points out that the deleted scenes included on the DVD help fill out the narrative. Critics have also pointed out similarities and references to Stanley Kubrick's The Shining (1980).

Scholar Heike Schwarz states that Session 9 "refers to DID [ Dissociative identity disorder ] and a possible possession with a demonic personality." 
M. Scott Peck also saw evil originating from weakness or cowardice.

Production

Development
Session 9 was director Brad Anderson's first horror film, after directing two romantic comedy films, Next Stop Wonderland (1998) and Happy Accidents (2000). Anderson describes Session 9 as an "American tragedy", and states that he and screenwriter Stephen Gevedon aimed "to subvert the conventions of the so-called horror genre that exists now", which he describes as "less horror than it is teen thriller."

The film's plot was inspired by the Richard Rosenthal case, a murder that took place in Boston, where Anderson grew up, in the mid-1990s, in which a man supposedly killed his wife after she accidentally burnt his dinner, then cut out her heart and lungs and put them in his backyard on a stake. Anderson states that it was also "as you imagine, very much inspired by the location", Danvers State Asylum.

Don't Look Now, directed by Nicolas Roeg, was one inspiration for the film, for its sense of place and because the lead character realizes in the climax that he is at the heart of the mystery. Anderson has stated that he aimed to use sound to convey the plot as well as to generate "a creepy tone"; the sound design incorporated the subliminal use of animal and mechanical noises.

Filming
Most of the film was shot in a small section of the Danvers Asylum; according to actor David Caruso, the rest of the building was "unsafe" for shooting. Caruso also claims the sets did not need to be dressed as all the props featured in the film were already there inside the building. Elaborating Caruso said:

It was one of the first motion pictures to be shot in 24p HD digital video, which shoots at 24 frames-per-second like film, as opposed to regular digital video which shoots at 30 frames-per-second.

Release 
Session 9 premiered at the Fantasia Festival in July 2001. It was released to theaters on August 10, playing on 30 screens. It ended its American theatrical run on October 18, grossing a total of $378,176. The film was a greater financial success abroad, earning $1.2 million internationally.

Critical response 
On Rotten Tomatoes  the film has an approval rating of 66% based on 74 reviews, with an average rating  6.30/10. The site's consensus states, "Relying more on atmosphere than gore, Session 9 is effectively creepy". On Metacritic it has a score of 58% based on reviews from 16 critics, indicating "mixed or average reviews."

Some critics praised the film's dark, eerie atmosphere and lack of gore. Entertainment Weekly called the film "a marvel of vérité nightmare atmosphere." Rolling Stone called it "a spine-tingler", and praised Brad Anderson's direction. Los Angeles Times said of the film: "Session 9 is so effective that its sense of uncertainty lingers long after the theater lights have gone up." Bloody Disgusting ranked the film fifth in its list of the twenty best horror films of the 2000s, writing, "Session 9 isn't just a cheap, hack 'n' slash, instantly-forgettable type horror film, but a psychologically probing, deeply unsettling journey off the edge and into the abyss of the human mind." Slant Magazine favorably compared it to the 1973 film Don't Look Now, writing, "Anderson's creeper is nowhere near as profound, but the film's old-fashioned pacing and revelatory camerawork bring to mind [Nicolas] Roeg's uniquely terrifying dreamworlds."

Some reviewers criticized the film's ending. A negative review came from Variety, which wrote, "while pic works up a nervously eerie paranoia, it finally doesn't know what to do with what it sets up." San Francisco Chronicle said, "the story doesn't quite pay off, characters are underwritten and the surprise ending is contrived and unconvincing." The Village Voice wrote, "the script for Session 9 is so underwritten that even such lively character actors as David Caruso, Peter Mullan and Brendan Sexton III are left stranded." Dave Kehr, in a mixed review for The New York Times, praises the "impeccable" performances and the dialogue's "authentic working-class snap", but criticizes the pacing which "often feels long and aimless", and concludes that the film "loses any sense of urgency or structure" because of Anderson's choice to leave the connections between events unstated.

Home media
USA Films and Universal Home Entertainment released a DVD of Session 9 on February 26, 2002. A Blu-ray edition was released in August 2016 by Scream Factory.

Soundtrack 

The score to Session 9 was composed by Seattle, Washington-based experimental band Climax Golden Twins. The score is in an ambient and dark ambient vein. The soundtrack was released on August 21, 2001, through Milan Records. "Choke Chain" by Sentridoh is played over the closing credits of the film, but is not featured on the album.

 Track listing

See also 

 Genius (mythology) – referring to spirits such as a Genius loci

References

Sources

External links 

 
 

2001 horror films
Films shot in Massachusetts
Films set in Massachusetts
American psychological horror films
2001 films
Films directed by Brad Anderson
2001 independent films
Films set in abandoned buildings and structures
Films set in psychiatric hospitals
Fratricide in fiction
Uxoricide in fiction
Filicide in fiction
Abandoned buildings and structures in fiction
2000s English-language films
2000s American films